Judah Leib Cahan (Yiddish: יהודה לייב כהן
) (1881 in Vilna, Lithuania – 1937 in New York City), more commonly known as Y.L. Cahan, was a Yiddish folklorist.

Biography 
Born in Vilna, Cahan moved as a youth to Warsaw, where he frequently attended Saturday night folksong recitals at the home of writer I. L. Peretz. After a brief stint in London, he moved to New York in 1904, and continued collecting folklore among the Yiddish-speaking Jews of New York. In 1925, Cahan helped organize the American branch of the YIVO, and was selected to lead its Folklore Committee. He was instrumental in expanding the folklore collection efforts of YIVO, and in 1930 returned to Vilna to train young scholars. After his death, YIVO planned to publish all of his works (collections of folk songs and folktales, and theoretical works), but only the folktales volume was published before the remaining material was destroyed during World War II.

References

External links
 
 Free song lyrics in Yiddish and sheet music of selected Yudishe Folkslieder collected by Yehudah Leib Cahan

1881 births
1937 deaths
People from Vilnius
19th-century Lithuanian Jews
Jewish folklorists
History of YIVO
Yiddish culture
Yiddish-language writers
Emigrants from the Russian Empire to the United States